Trimmer Hill is a historic Queen Anne style house at 230 6th St. in Pacific Grove, California that is listed on the National Register of Historic Places (NRHP).  It was built in 1893.

It was built for medical Dr. Oliver Smith Trimmer, first mayor of Pacific Grove, and mayor for 20 years.  It was listed on the NRHP in 1982.

Its 1980 NRHP nomination asserts it is "an unaltered, exuberant example of period Queen Anne styling....one of the most outstanding examples of its type and period in a community which is known for its 19th century architecture."  The house was also described as "'a very good
example of the Queen Anne style'" in A Guide to Architecture in San Francisco and Northern California.

References 

Houses on the National Register of Historic Places in California
Houses on the National Register of Historic Places in Monterey County, California
Queen Anne architecture in California
Houses completed in 1893
Houses in Monterey County, California
Pacific Grove, California
National Register of Historic Places in Monterey County, California